University of the Sacred Heart may refer to:
University of the Sacred Heart (Puerto Rico) in Puerto Rico
University of the Sacred Heart (Japan) in Japan
University of the Sacred Heart Gulu, in Uganda
Università Cattolica del Sacro Cuore, with campuses in several cities in Italy
Universidade do Sagrado Coração, in Brazil